Stony Kill Farm is located on NY 9D in the Town of Fishkill, New York, United States. It is a 1,000+ acre (3 km2) working farm owned and operated by the state Department of Environmental Conservation (DEC) as an environmental education center.

In 1683, settlers Gulian Verplanck and Francis Rombout bought the 85,000-acre (430 km2) tract, including the farm, from the Wappinger people for goods worth approximately $1,250. In 1708 the Great Partition of this land put the area around the farm in the Verplanck family's hands. Instead of working it themselves, they took in tenant farmers to keep the land worked and productive. They built the stone tenant farmhouse near the property's main entrance in four sections between the late 17th and early 19th centuries.

An 1836 subdivision of the property gave a thousand acres (4 km2), including the current farm, to descendant James DeLancy Verplanck of nearby Beacon. He had a Greek Revival home, now known as the Manor House, built and moved into it in 1842.

A century later, his descendants gave the farm to the state Education Department (SED) for use as a teaching farm. It was used for this purpose by SUNY Farmingdale until the late 1960s, when the college decided it no longer needed the property. In 1973 DEC took it over and converted it to its present use. It was added to the National Register of Historic Places in 1980.

Today, DEC uses the property to help visitors learn about basic ecological issues. They can either do this on their own, by walking the property and hiking several trails or perusing the library at the Manor House, or by taking part in the many programs DEC offers or sponsors with other groups on the site.

References

External links
Stony Kill Foundation
Official DEC site

Farms on the National Register of Historic Places in New York (state)
Fishkill, New York
Nature centers in New York (state)
National Register of Historic Places in Dutchess County, New York
Protected areas of Dutchess County, New York
Education in Dutchess County, New York